The Battle of Swolna took place 11 August 1812 near the village of Swolna where Oudinot ran at the river Svolna into the Russians.

Prelude
Napoleon had sent a Bavarian Corps to reinforce the troops of Oudinot. Although they were hit hard by dysentery Oudinot started a new offensive.

Battle 

Neither side was able to enforce the crossing of the Svolna.

Aftermath 
Oudinot retreated behind the Drissa.

See also
List of battles of the French invasion of Russia

Notes

References

External links
 

Battles of the French invasion of Russia
Battles of the Napoleonic Wars
Battles involving Russia
Battles involving France
Conflicts in 1812
July 1812 events
August 1812 events
19th century in the Russian Empire
1812 in the Russian Empire
1812 in Belarus